Geoff McNamara is an Australian former professional rugby league footballer who played in the 1990s. He played for Canberra in the Super League/NRL competitions.

Playing career
McNamara made his first grade debut for round 3 of the 1997 Super League season against Canterbury at Belmore Sports Ground. In the 1998 NRL season, McNamara played 19 games as Canberra qualified for the finals. He played in both finals matches against Manly and Melbourne.

References

1973 births
Canberra Raiders players
Australian rugby league players
Rugby league wingers
Living people